Alburtis is a borough in Lehigh County, Pennsylvania. The borough's population was 2,596 as of the 2020 census. It is a suburb of Allentown, the third largest city in Pennsylvania. It is part of the Lehigh Valley metropolitan area, which had a population of 861,899 and was the 68th most populous metropolitan area in the U.S. as of the 2020 census.

Geography
The Alburtis ZIP code (18011) comprises two separate areas stretching from south of Trexlertown well into District township of neighboring Berks County. Alburtis has a hot-summer humid continental climate (Dfa) and is in hardiness zone 6b. Average monthly temperatures range from 29.1°F in January to 73.6°F in July.

History
The Borough of Alburtis was incorporated on May 9, 1913 by the merger of two villages, Alburtis and Lock Ridge, both of which were settled in the mid-1800s. Alburtis was named for Edward K. Alburtis, a civil engineer involved in the construction of the East Pennsylvania Branch of the Philadelphia and Reading Railway.  When a railroad station was established in the village in 1859, the railroad's board of directors named it in his honor.

A tract adjacent to Alburtis was purchased by the Lockridge Iron Company for the construction of iron furnaces in the late 1860s. This area, which grew into a separate village, became known as Lock Ridge Park. The Thomas Iron Company and George F. Schlicher Hotel, both in Alburtis, are listed on the National Register of Historic Places.

Demographics

As of the census of 2000, there were 2,117 people, 774 households and 593 families residing in the borough. The population density was 2,993.2 per square mile (1,151.2/km2). There were 799 housing units at an average density of 1,129.7 per square mile (434.5/km2). The racial makeup of the borough was 97.21% White, 0.33% African American, 0.05% Native American, 1.42% Asian, 0.24% Pacific Islander, 0.24% from other races, and 0.52% from two or more races. Hispanic or Latino of any race were 0.85% of the population.

There were 774 households, of which 42.6% had children under the age of 18 living with them, 62.5% were married couples living together, 9.2% had a female householder with no husband present, and 23.3% were non-families. 18.9% of all households were made up of individuals, and 5.6% had someone living alone who was 65 years of age or older. The average household size was 2.74 and the average family size was 3.13.

In the borough, the population was spread out, with 29.7% of the population under the age of 18, 6.5% from 18 to 24, 38.6% from 25 to 44, 17.9% from 45 to 64, and 7.3% who were 65 years of age or older. The median age was 33 years. For every 100 females there were 99.5 males. For every 100 females age 18 and over, there were 97.7 males. The median income for a household in the borough was $52,361, and the median income for a family was $57,863. Males had a median income of $36,915 compared with $27,094 for females. The per capita income for the borough was $20,611. About 2.8% of families and 3.4% of the population were below the poverty line, including 3.4% of those under age 18 and 8.8% of those age 65 or over.

Public education
Alburtis is served by East Penn School District. Emmaus High School in Emmaus serves grades nine through twelve. Eyer Middle School and Lower Macungie Middle School, both in Macungie, serve grades six through eight. One of the district's seven elementary schools, Alburtis Elementary School, is located in Alburtis.

Recreation
Lock Ridge Park is the predominant public park in Alburtis. Swabia Creek flows through the park and borough. The borough also includes a community center, pool, and several baseball fields.

Alburtis is the current home of the Frankford Radio Club, a long-running amateur radio club founded at Frankford High School in Philadelphia around 1927.

Transportation

No numbered highways served Alburtis directly. Main thoroughfares through the borough include Franklin Street, Main Street, Penn Avenue and Front Street. The nearest numbered highway is Pennsylvania Route 100.

Notable person
Gibby Hatton, former track cyclist

References

External links

 Official borough website

1857 establishments in Pennsylvania
Boroughs in Lehigh County, Pennsylvania
Boroughs in Pennsylvania
Populated places established in 1857